Steenokkerzeel is a municipality located in the Belgian province of Flemish Brabant. The municipality comprises the towns of Melsbroek, Perk and Steenokkerzeel proper. On December 31, 2010 Steenokkerzeel had a total population of 11,580. The total area is 23.46 km² which gives a population density of 493 inhabitants per km². (Steenokkerzeel: 6.333 inhabitants, Melbroek 2.508 inhabitants, Perk 2.739 inhabitants.)

Steenokkerzeel consists of the townships of Humelgem, Steenokkerzeel and Wambeek. Perk consists of the townships Perk, Huinhoven and Boekt. 't Dickt, Passiewijk and Zonnebos are the names of residential areas in Steenokkerzeel.

Education 
 Sabena Flight Academy

Notable inhabitants
Aguila (born 1937), artist, industrial designer, and founder of the “probability reality”
Zita of Bourbon-Parma, the last Empress of Austria, Queen of Hungary, and Queen of Bohemia.

References

External links

 

 
Municipalities of Flemish Brabant